National Tertiary Route 810, or just Route 810 (or ) is a National Road Route of Costa Rica, located in the Limón province.

Description
In Limón province the route covers Pococí canton (Jiménez, Roxana districts).

References

Highways in Costa Rica